Harold Webster (January 18, 1895 – November 7, 1958) was a Canadian athlete who competed in the 1936 Summer Olympics. He was born in Newhall, Derbyshire, United Kingdom of Great Britain and Ireland. In 1936 he participated in the Olympic marathon event but did not finish the race. At the 1930 Empire Games he finished tenth in the 6 miles competition. Four years later he won the gold medal in the marathon contest at the 1934 Empire Games.

References

Harold Webster's profile at Sports Reference.com
Article on the Harold Webster memorial race

1895 births
1958 deaths
English emigrants to Canada
Canadian male long-distance runners
Canadian male marathon runners
Olympic track and field athletes of Canada
Athletes (track and field) at the 1936 Summer Olympics
Athletes (track and field) at the 1930 British Empire Games
Athletes (track and field) at the 1934 British Empire Games
Commonwealth Games gold medallists for Canada
Commonwealth Games medallists in athletics
Sportspeople from Derbyshire
Medallists at the 1934 British Empire Games